On 18 April 2020, gangs killed 47 people in villages in Katsina State, northern Nigeria. Hundreds of people have been killed during the last year in northwestern Nigeria by gangs and bandits who carry out robberies, kidnappings, murders, and cattle rustling. Similar attacks had happened in Katsina State in February 2020.

Incident 
The attackers, some armed with AK-47s, carried out the simultaneous mass murders in Danmusa, Dutsemna and Safana between 12:30am and 3am. About 300 armed men were involved in attacking the villages and demanding the food and other relief materials given as part of the government's efforts to help during the lockdown due to the coronavirus pandemic.

Response 
Members of the Police, Army, Air Force, Civil Defense and the Department of State Services were sent to the area. Minister of Public Affairs Mohammed Dingyadi released a statement through his Press Secretary Osaigbovo Ehisienmen to express his condolences to the government, the people of the state and the families impacted, he also said that the perpetrators would be found and dealt with. President Muhammadu Buhari condemned the attack and directed security agencies not to rest or lower their guard which he believed would create a vacuum to allow for the continued movement of the bandits.

The President of the Association of Industrial Security and Safety Operators of Nigeria, Dr. Ona Ekhomu stated that the blame for the attacks should be placed on the Commissioner of Police, Katsina State Police Command and the Military Commander in the state, due to security lapses.

References

2020 murders in Nigeria
2020s massacres in Nigeria
21st century in Katsina State
April 2020 crimes in Africa
April 2020 events in Nigeria
April 2020 attacks
Massacres in 2020
Violent non-state actor incidents in Nigeria

Nigerian bandit conflict